The 1988 Superbike World Championship was the inaugural FIM Superbike World Championship season. The season started on 3 April at Donington Park and finished on 3 October at Manfeild Autocourse after 9 rounds.

American Fred Merkel won the riders' championship and Honda won the manufacturers' championship.

Race calendar and results
The second Le Mans race was not held due to schedule issues.

Championship standings

For the first ever Superbike World Championship round at Donington Park, and for the only time in the championship's history, the race results were combined to determine an overall winner. For future weekends, it was decided to award half points for each race instead, although the original system was used again at Le Mans due to only one race being run.

Riders' standings

Manufacturers' standings

References

External links

 
Superbike World Championship seasons
Superbike